The Kapshagay Hydroelectric Power Plant (Qapshaǵaı sý elektr stantsııasy; , earlier Капчагайская ГЭС) is a hydroelectricity power plant on the Ili River in Almaty Province of Kazakhstan. Constructed between 1965 and 1970, it has four individual turbines with a nominal output of around 91 MW which will deliver up to 364 MW of power and generates 972 million kilowatt-hours of electricity per year.

It is operated by Almaty Power Stations, and fed by Kapchagay Reservoir (resulting from the construction of Kapchagay Dam).

References

External links

Hydroelectric power stations in Kazakhstan
Hydroelectric power stations built in the Soviet Union